The following is a list of SingStar games released for the PlayStation 2 video game console. The tables list the songs available in each game, with the country of availability indicated by two-letter country codes. For games that were localised for multiple markets, songs are either indicated as present ("Yes") or absent ("No") in the track list for each region.

The first game in the series, SingStar, was released in Europe and Oceania in 2004. , over twenty games in the SingStar series have been released in English-speaking territories, including a small number in North America.

Most SingStar games are loosely based upon musical genres, such as rock or pop music (SingStar Rocks! and SingStar Pop respectively). Artist-specific SingStar games have been released, featuring artists such as ABBA, Queen, Take That, Die Toten Hosen, Kent and Mecano.

SingStar

SingStar '80s
All non-English releases which are not in the table have the same tracklist as UK.

SingStar '90s
All non-English releases have the same tracklist as UK.

SingStar ABBA

SingStar Amped

SingStar Anthems
All releases have the same tracklist as UK.

SingStar Boy Bands vs Girl Bands

Singstar Chart Hits

This is an Australian and New Zealand only game.

SingStar Country

SingStar Hottest Hits

SingStar Legends
(Titled SingStar Legendat in Finland)

SingStar Motown

SingStar Party
(Titled SingStar NRJ Music Tour in France)

SingStar Pop (known as SingStar Popworld in the UK, as Singstar - The Dome in Germany, as Singstar - Svenska Hits in Sweden and as SingStar Norske Hits in Norway)

SingStar Pop Hits

SingStar Pop Vol 2

SingStar Queen

SingStar R&B

SingStar Rock Ballads

SingStar Rocks!

SingStar Singalong With Disney

SingStar Studio 100
This is an Netherlands and Belgium only game.

SingStar Summer Party (known as SingStar Party Hits in Australia)

SingStar Take That

SingStar The Wiggles

See also
 List of songs in SingStar games (PlayStation 3)

References

External links

SingStar catalogues:
 Australia
 United Kingdom
 United States

Lists of songs in music video games
SingStar
PlayStation 2
2